Frank Leroy Farrar (April 2, 1929 – October 31, 2021) was an American politician who was the 24th governor of South Dakota. A Republican from Britton, he served as the state's attorney general from 1963 to 1969, and as governor from 1969 to 1971. After leaving office, he chaired several holding companies and became the owner of numerous banks.

Early life and education
Farrar was born in Britton, South Dakota, the son of Venetia Soule (Taylor) and Virgil W. Farrar. He was an Eagle Scout, student body president and graduated from the local high school in Britton in 1947. He earned a B.S. from the University of South Dakota (USD) an LL.B. degree from the USD School of Law. He joined the Reserve Officers' Training Corps as a student at USD, and was in the U.S. Army Reserve from 1949 through 1953, and on active duty during the Korean War from 1953 to 1955. He attained the rank of captain by the time he retired from the Army Reserve. He married the former Patricia Henley on June 5, 1953, in Fort Benning, Georgia, where he was stationed in the U.S. Army. Frank and Patricia Farrar raised five children, Jeanne, Sally, Robert,  Mary and Anne.

Career
After the Korean War ended, Farrar was an Internal Revenue Service Agent until 1957.  He was a judge in 1958.  Farrar served as State's Attorney for Marshall County from 1959 to 1962. He also served as President of the States Attorneys Association. 
   
On May 22, 1962, Farrar announced that he was running for Attorney General of South Dakota.  Sterling Clark, of Belle Fourche, also ran for the Republican nomination for Attorney General. Farrar won the nomination with 96,608 1/2 votes to 57,339 1/2 votes for Clark. Farrar went on to defeat Democrat Thomas E. Poe of Vermillion, South Dakota, in the general election. Poe had replaced Democrat William Day of Winner, South Dakota, who resigned his candidacy for business reasons. At 33 years old at the time, he was the youngest person in the history of South Dakota to be elected as the state's attorney general.

On July 1, 1964, Farrar sought re-nomination as attorney general. He was re-elected with 157,848 votes, defeating Democrat William C. Grady, who received 125,047. In the 1966 general election, Farrar ran against Democrat Robert M. Swanson, and won a third term with 141,734 votes to 79,670 for Swanson. With Farrar's election to a third term, there was much speculation that he would be the heir apparent for Republican Gubernatorial nomination in 1968. In his three two-year terms as the state's attorney general, he focused on crackdowns on drug users and dealers, and much efforts were put into the enforcement of insurance, banking and securities laws.

With his success and popularity through the years as South Dakota's attorney general, Farrar garnered more than 57% of the vote to defeat the Democratic candidate Robert Chamberlin in the 1968 gubernatorial election. As governor, he continued his work on reducing drug-related crimes, improving consumer protection and modernizing the state’s regulatory authority over the banking and insurance industries. However, he lost much support when he raised the state sales tax from 3% to 4% and promoted unpopular reforms in the energy sector, which led to him being defeated when running for reelection 2 years later. That was “the only election I lost in my life,” he later remarked in a 2014 interview. As of 2021, this was the last time for an elected, sitting governor of South Dakota to lose re-election.

After his two-year term as governor concluded, Farrar moved back to Britton to practice law. He also became a successful banker later in life, buying, operating and selling a number of local banks in small towns and in rural areas in the Dakotas, Minnesota and as far as Indiana, Montana and New Mexico. As a philanthropist, he generously supported various non-profit organizations, such as Scouts, the March of Dimes, and the South Dakota Community Foundation.

Later life
Farrar was a licensed aviator who flew to visit the banks he owned, and over the years, he accumulated over 17,000 hours of logged piloting time.  He was also an avid athlete, completing the Kona Ironman Competition at age 73, a decade after surviving lymphatic cancer.  He held the 9th fastest finishing time in the Coeur D’Alene Ironman in the 70+ Men's division.  He completed the 2003 race in 16:48:49. His wife, former First Lady of South Dakota Patricia Farrar, who was also a Senior Olympian, died on October 31, 2015, at the age of 84.

On October 31, 2021, the sixth anniversary of the death of his wife of sixty-two years, Farrar died in Rochester, Minnesota, at age 92. He is survived by his five children, eight grandchildren and two great-grandchildren.

Honors and awards
 Alumni of the Year for the School of Business at the University of South Dakota (USD), 1979
 the USD Achievement Award, 1981
 Distinguished Eagle Scout Award, 2001
 Inducted into the South Dakota Hall of Fame, 2006.
 Parade Marshal for the 104th "Dakota Days" homecoming parade at USD, 2018

References

External links
 National Governors Association: Frank Farrar
 KDLT News: "Frank Farrar: A Man Made of Iron" 
 Ironman: "Meet Frank Farrar, Kona's Last Official Finisher in 2002"
 

|-

|-

1929 births
2021 deaths
20th-century American politicians
Aviators from South Dakota
District attorneys in South Dakota
Republican Party governors of South Dakota
Military personnel from South Dakota
People from Britton, South Dakota
Senior Olympic competitors
South Dakota Attorneys General
South Dakota lawyers
United States Army personnel of the Korean War
University of South Dakota alumni
Internal Revenue Service people